Keith Boxell (born 1968), is a male former weightlifter who competed for Great Britain and England.

Weightlifting career
Boxell represented Great Britain in the 1984 Summer Olympics, 1988 Summer Olympics and 1992 Summer Olympics.

He represented England and won a gold medal in the 90 kg middle-heavyweight division, at the 1986 Commonwealth Games in Edinburgh, Scotland. Four years later he represented England and won three silver medals in the 90 kg middle-heavyweight division, at the 1990 Commonwealth Games in Auckland, New Zealand. The three medals were won during an unusual period when three medals were awarded in one category (clean and jerk, snatch and combined) which invariably led to the same athlete winning all three of the same colour medal.

References

1968 births
English male weightlifters
Commonwealth Games medallists in weightlifting
Commonwealth Games gold medallists for England
Commonwealth Games silver medallists for England
Weightlifters at the 1986 Commonwealth Games
Weightlifters at the 1990 Commonwealth Games
Weightlifters at the 1984 Summer Olympics
Weightlifters at the 1988 Summer Olympics
Weightlifters at the 1992 Summer Olympics
Olympic weightlifters of Great Britain
People from Clapham
Sportspeople from London
Living people
Medallists at the 1986 Commonwealth Games
Medallists at the 1990 Commonwealth Games